Radio Carmarthenshire is an Independent Local Radio station broadcasting to Carmarthenshire. It is owned and operated by Nation Broadcasting and broadcasts on 97.1 and 97.5 FM from studios near the St Hilary transmitter in the Vale of Glamorgan.

The station plays chart music from the 1980s to the present day, alongside local news, weather, travel and community information.

As of December 2022, the station broadcasts to a weekly audience of 18,000, according to RAJAR.

History 
Following the successful launch of Radio Pembrokeshire in 2002, the owners, led by Keri Jones, founded Radio Carmarthenshire in mid-2003 in order to bid for the Carmarthenshire licence. Another applicant, Carmarthenshire Sound (led by The Wireless Group – owners of the Swansea-based stations The Wave and Swansea Sound) withdrew from the bidding process, leaving Radio Carmarthenshire unopposed.

The station began broadcasting on Sunday 13 June 2004 from Radio Pembrokeshire's Narberth studios. Four months after launch, the station was given a yellow card warning by the broadcasting regulator OFCOM, following complaints about the levels of Welsh language programming as it broadcast no Welsh language content.

In August 2006, the station was sold to Town & Country Broadcasting (now Nation Broadcasting).

In September 2016, Nation Broadcasting announced plans to relocate Radio Carmarthenshire and its two sister services from the Narberth studios to the group's headquarters near the St Hilary transmitter on the outskirts of Cowbridge. The station switched broadcasting to the St Hilary studios at 10am on Tuesday 22 November 2016, although the Narberth site was retained as a studio for digital multimedia, marketing and as a sales office.

Programming
The majority of Radio Carmarthenshire's output is produced and broadcast from Nation Broadcasting's St Hilary studios. Most programming and presenters is shared with sister stations Radio Pembrokeshire and Bridge FM.

Presenter-led shows air from 6am to 7pm on weekdays, 8am to 6pm on Saturdays and 6am to 10pm on Sundays. A weekly hour-long Welsh language music programme on Sunday evenings, shared with Radio Pembrokeshire.

News
Local news bulletins air hourly from 6am – 7pm on weekdays and 7am – 1pm at weekends with headlines on the half-hour during weekday breakfast and drivetime.

As of 2021, the station's local bulletins are produced under contract by Bauer's Swansea newsroom.

National news bulletins from Sky News Radio air hourly at other times.

References

External links

Radio stations in Wales
Carmarthenshire
Nation Broadcasting
Radio stations established in 2004